Lockport Township is a township in Haskell County, Kansas, USA.  As of the 2000 census, its population was 522.

Geography
According to the USGS, it contains one cemetery, Colusa.

References
 USGS Geographic Names Information System (GNIS)

External links
 US-Counties.com
 City-Data.com

Townships in Haskell County, Kansas
Townships in Kansas